Roger L. Counsil (January 11, 1935 – August 8, 2017) was a former American gymnastics coach and head of the United States Gymnastics Federation, now known as USA Gymnastics.

Biography
Counsil was born on January 11, 1935, in Wood River, Illinois. He was a standout athlete at Southern Illinois University, where he competed in track, swimming and gymnastics. He was the NAIA 1-meter diving champion in 1957, the same year he was named "Most Valuable Athlete" at SIU.  In addition to his bachelor's degree, he earned his Master's from SIU and completed his doctorate in Higher Education Administration at Indiana University.

For 17 years, he coached at Indiana State University.

Counsil was named Olympic coach for the U.S.-boycotted 1980 Summer Olympics and held several other positions. These included 

 Chairman of the NCAA Gymnastics Committee
 Men's coach for the U.S. team in the 1978 World Games 
 Host coach for the 1975 NCAA National Championships in Terre Haute 
 National "Coach of the Year" and four-time recipient of Mideast "Coach of the Year" honors
 Executive Director of the USA Gymnastics, a position he assumed after leaving ISU in February 1980

In 1985, he was inducted into the Indiana State University and Southern Illinois University Athletics Hall of Fame. On August 8, 2014, he was selected as Institutional Great by the Missouri Valley Conference and inducted into the Conference Hall of Fame.

Death
Counsil died on August 8, 2017 at the age of 82.

References 

1935 births
2017 deaths
People from Wood River, Illinois
American male artistic gymnasts
Gymnastics coaches from Indiana
Indiana University alumni
Indiana State University alumni
Indiana State Sycamores men's gymnastics coaches
Southern Illinois Salukis men's gymnasts
Southern Illinois Salukis men's swimmers
Southern Illinois Salukis men's track and field athletes